Bhanu Kumar Shastri (29 October 1925 – 24 February 2018) was a member of Lok Sabha from Udaipur in Rajasthan state in India. He also served as the president of Rajasthan state unit of Jan Sangh.

References

External links
 Parliamentofindia

1925 births
2018 deaths
Rajasthani politicians
India MPs 1977–1979
People from Udaipur
Lok Sabha members from Rajasthan
Bharatiya Jana Sangh politicians
Politicians from Udaipur